Dr Ernest Fooks (born Ernest Leslie Fuchs, 6 October 1906 – 4 December 1985) was an influential European-trained architect who made a significant contribution to architecture, town planning, and design education in Australia and to the cultural life of Melbourne after emigrating to the city just before the Second World War.

Early life
He was born as Ernest Fuchs in 1906 in Bratislava, Czechoslovakia, when it was part of Austria-Hungary. His family moved to Vienna in 1908 where he went on to study architecture at the Vienna Technical University, completing a doctorate in Technical Science with a major in Town Planning, and opening his own architectural practice in 1932. Facing extreme anti-semitism, in 1939 he migrated to Australia via Canada, where he married his Latvian born wife Noemi Matusevic. They arrived in Melbourne in April, and he soon gained a position as a town planner with the nascent Housing Commission of Victoria. In 1944 he was appointed the first lecturer in town planning at the Melbourne Technical College (now the Royal Melbourne Institute of Technology). In 1945 he became an Australian citizen and anglicised his name to Fooks. Three years later he resigned from Housing Commission Victoria and opened his own practice. In August 1948 he was elected Associate of the Royal Institute of British Architects, and was later elected President of the Jewish Society of Arts.

Key influences and design approach
Fooks was a key proponent of the International Modern Movement in Australian architecture. Like his contemporary Robin Boyd, Fooks had relatively few opportunities to design major buildings and is best known for his numerous residential projects. From 1950, his firm designed over forty apartment blocks in and around the Eastern suburbs of Melbourne. By the mid 1950s, his practice expanded to take on commercial projects including La Ronde jewellery shop in Collins Street, Melbourne CBD, Capri Espresso Bar in Footscray and the Public Trustees Building in Exhibition St.

Apartment Buildings
Fooks saw apartment living as a necessity in successful urban planning. His book “Xray the City: The Density Diagram, Basis for Urban Planning”, published in 1946, with a foreword by H.C. Coombs, the Director-General for the Ministry of Post-War Reconstruction, showcased his ideas and voiced his concerns regarding construction and environments in post-war Melbourne. He was the first to discuss the issue of increasing urban density, well ahead of government legislation acknowledging the same issue more than half a century later. Fooks noted that density alone was not responsible for poor urban living conditions, but that the quality of urban living was related to socioeconomic factors, community life and access to quality housing and open spaces for leisure.

 Park View Flats, 5 Herbert Street, St Kilda
 647 Inkerman Street, Caulfield North
 35 Kooyong Road, Caulfield North
 20 Denmark Hill Road, Hawthorn East
 162 Brighton Road, Ripponlea
 Kluska Flats, 55 Wanda Road, Caulfield North
 7 Kooyong Road, Armadale
 16 Khartoum Street, Caulfield North
 20 Cardigan Street, St Kilda East
 6 Bella Vista Road, Caulfield North
 5 The Avenue, Windsor
 3 Struan Street, Toorak

Early Houses, 1948–53
Fooks created houses of architectural significance with individual, and highly creative designs which combined analytical planning with aspects of Scandinavian and European modern design and incorporated principles of traditional Japanese architecture. Fooks' residential architecture underwent three distinct phases, the first of which expressed post-war austerity through conventional forms and finishes. There was a common and straightforward vocabulary in Fooks' early houses which included plain face cream or yellow brickwork, basic hipped or gabled terracotta roofs and simple double-fronted facades. Though these early designs were simple in form, Fooks' was beginning to introduce sophisticated modernist ideas and features. His Sternberg House in Kew (1948) was designed on the "principles of solar control" and incorporated almost full height windows, glazed doors and generous paved terrace areas.

Middle Period, 1954–59
Fooks' middle period exhibited an International Modern style, characterised by low-pitched, flat and butterfly roofs, and bold massings of box-like forms that projected and receded to create striking spaces of solids and voids in finishes of brick and feature stonework. His Appel House in Caulfield North (1955) was a two-storey flat-roofed house with generous windows, and cream brick walls relieved by a broad stone-clad chimney and simple but elegant metal balustrades to the first floor balcony and roof terrace above.

Later Period, 1960 onwards
Finally, Fooks' Mature, Minimalist style was characterised by efficient structural forms, a reduced palette of materials, generous amounts of glass and elegantly simple details.  His domestic projects involved complex and carefully detailed multi-layered open-plan living and thoughtfully constructed surrounding landscapes. His Lansell Rd House (1963) is of aesthetic significance for its high level of craftsmanship in joinery and finishes in folding and sliding screens and built-in teak furniture and cabinetry.

Fooks designed a house for himself and Noemi at 32 Howitt Road in Caulfield North.

He designed the National Jewish Memorial Centre and Community Facility in Canberra, which was completed in 1971.

Legacy
Fooks died on 4 December 1985 aged 79. The annual Ernest Fooks Memorial Award was established in his honour by the University of Melbourne for excellence in architectural design. A retrospective exhibition titled "In Quest & Praise of Indigenous Architecture" was held at the Caulfield Arts Complex in 1989.

Awards
The Adams House, on Lansell Road in Toorak, was voted Family Home of the year by Australian House and Garden magazine in 1966.

Exhibitions
 ‘Cities of Yesterday’, Kozminsky Galleries, Melbourne, March–April 1944
 ‘Two-faced Metropolis’, Kozminsky Galleries, Melbourne, October 1952
 ‘Tribal Architecture, Tribal Villages’, Caulfield Arts Centre, March 1980
 ‘Travels throughout the world’, Caulfield Arts Centre, August 1984
 ‘In quest and praise of indigenous architecture and folk art, a Retrospective’, Caulfield Arts Complex, October 1989
 ‘45 Storeys. A Retrospective of works by Melbourne Jewish Architects from 1945’, National Gallery of Victoria, March 1993.
 ‘N:Notable and Modern. Post-War domestic architecture in the City of Glen Eira’, Exhibition at Glen Eira City Gallery, July 2001.

Publications

 Stadt in Streifen. Thesis, Vienna Technical University, 1932
 The city in strips. Excerpts, Vienna 2011, transl. C. Car
 ‘Das Wachsende Haus’, Abend 17 March 1932, p. 7.
 ‘Das Wachsende Haus’, Der Bauunternehmer, n. 34 [1932]
 ‘Das Hochhaus in der Herrengasse. Wiens erstes Hochhaus. Ein Werk der Architekten Prof. Baurat S. Theiss-H.Jaksch’, Austria Press, Buenos Aires 20 May 1933
 ‘Arbeit der Stadt’, Die Neue Stadt, [1933]
 ‘Le Gratte-Ciel dela Herrengasse a Vienne’, Architecture et Urbanisme, [1933]
 ‘Simplicity in furnishing a small house’, Australian Home Beautiful 1 May 1940 pp. 25–27.
 ‘An Architect Visits Norway’, AHB 1 July 1940, pp. 24–26
 ‘The complete Architect. What his task embraces in making a home beautiful’, AHB February 1941, pp. 20–22
 ‘The demand for better living conditions’, AHB February 1942, pp. 10–11
 ‘The Democratic City. Town Planning in Russia and Australia’, Australian Quarterly March 1942, pp. 81–85
 ‘Function and Beauty should combine in Interior Design’, AHB April 1942 pp. 12–13,33
 ‘The Development of Outdoor Shelters’, AHB July 1942, pp. 10–11
 ‘An Analysis of Indoor Shelters’, AHB August 1942, pp. 37–38.
 ‘Town-Planning: The Soviet Solution’, World Digest of current Fact and comment October 1942, n.p
 ‘Form follows function. The fundamental principles of interior decoration’, AHB June 1943, pp. 19–21.
 ‘Milan’ (drawing) AHB September 1943, p. 4
 ‘Travels through Europe. Leaves from an architect’s sketchbook’, AHB October 1943, pp. 19–22.
 ‘The ABC of Physical Planning’, NSW Contract Reporter3 December 1943 pp. 1,6
 ‘The ABC of Physical Planning’, Part 2 NSW Contract reporter 24 December 1943 pp. 1,6
 ‘Yesterday and Tomorrow. Town Development Past and Future’, AHB February 1944, pp. 6–9

 ‘Towards Physical Planning’, Australian Quarterly March 1944, pp. 84–95
 ‘Yesterday and Tomorrow. Town Development Past and Future’, Part 2, AHB March 1944, pp. 6–10. Also published in Town and Country Planning Association of Victoria Journal n.d. pp. 82–85.
 ‘Cities of Yesterday. Notes on an Exhibition of Drawings’, AHB April 1944, pp. 6–8.
 ‘Travels through Europe. Leaves from an Architect’s Sketchbook’, AHB 1944 Cover and pp. 19–21.
 ‘Beehive Cities and Hitler’s Europe’, Salt 24 April 1944, pp. 24–27
 ‘The Science of Town Planning’, paper delivered to planning of Science Conference of Scientists, Melbourne University, June 1944.
 ‘The Science of Town Planning’, Australian Municipal Journal20 September 1944, pp. 80–85
 ‘Cities Tell’, paper delivered to VASS 2 October 1944
 ‘Wartime Housing in Europe: Switzerland’, AHB August 1945 pp. 12–15.
 ‘The blight of a crowded city’, AHB April 1946, pp. 12–13
 Autumn series of lectures delivered to the planning Institute of Victoria, 1946
 Ernest Fooks, X-Ray the City. The Density Diagram: Basis for Urban Planning, Ruskin Press, Melbourne, 1946.
 ‘Chandigarh. The New Capital of Punjab, India ’, B'nai B'rith Bulletin February 1962.
 ‘USSR’, Architecture Today November 1958 pp. 23–29.
 ‘Architectural trends overseas’, Architecture today December 1958 pp. 19–23.
 ‘Is B’nai B’rith a brotherhood?’, B.B.Bulletin May 1969, pp. 10–11.
 ‘Jerusalem: A two-faced metropolis’, B.B.Bulletin October 1971, pp. 21–22.

References

External links
  Ernest and Noemi Fooks' Private Residence
 State Library of Victoria Ernest Fooks
  Big White House 16 Cantala Ave Caulfield North
 National Library of Australia Trove Ernest Fooks
 Austrian National Library (in German)
 Fooks at Karlsruher Institut für Technologie (in German)

20th-century Australian architects
1906 births
1985 deaths
Architects from Vienna
Jewish emigrants from Austria to Australia after the Anschluss
TU Wien alumni
Fellows of the Royal Institute of British Architects
Academic staff of RMIT University
Architects from Melbourne
People from Caulfield, Victoria